Blockchain is a sequential distributed database used in cryptocurrencies.

Blockchain or block chain may also refer to:

 Blockchain.com, a bitcoin exchange, wallet, and explorer service
 Cipher Block Chaining, a block cipher mode of operation in cryptography
 Blockchain, a 2021 mixtape by Money Man
 Bar-link chain, a kind of mechanical drive chain also known as a block chain